"Coney Island" is a spoken-word song written by Northern Irish singer-songwriter Van Morrison and included on his 1989 album, Avalon Sunset.  The narrative is accompanied by lush instrumentation which contrasts with Morrison's thick Ulster brogue.

The singer revisits his youthful trips with his mother to the seaside at Coney Island, in County Down, Northern Ireland. The trip from Belfast in the song names the localities of Downpatrick, St. John's Point, Strangford Lough, Shrigley, Killyleagh, Lecale District and Ardglass. The narrative vividly pictures a bright autumn day of birdwatching, stopping for Sunday papers, and for "a couple of jars of mussels and some potted herrings in case we get famished before dinner."  A reviewer noted:  "You get a great rush of satisfaction here; in knowing that Van Morrison, despite his long, painful progress towards spiritual election, is still a ravenous foodie at heart."

The village of Shrigley dating back to 1824 was replaced with  modern homes and shops after 1968 but a restored village as seen by Morrison and his mother is being planned. The song ends with the spoken words: "Wouldn't it be great if it was like this all the time?"

Cash Box called it "poetic" and an "instant classic."

Appearance on other albums
It was one of the songs featured on the 1993 compilation album, The Best of Van Morrison Volume Two.
"Coney Island" has been re-mastered and included on the 2007 3CD limited edition album, Still on Top – The Greatest Hits.

Personnel
Van Morrisonvocal, guitar
Clive Culbertsonbass guitar
Neil Drinkwatersynthesizer
Roy Jones, Dave Earlydrums, percussion
Arty McGlynnguitar

Renditions
Liam Neeson performed the song on the 1994 Van Morrison tribute album, No Prima Donna: The Songs of Van Morrison.  A single was also released with Neeson's version.

Dustin the Turkey performed a parody of the song called "Bull Island", which told the story of a day out resulting in his arrest at the end. It was featured on his Not Just a Pretty Face album as well as Dustin's Greatest Hits.

References

Sources
Rogan, Johnny (2006). Van Morrison: No Surrender, London:Vintage Books 

Van Morrison songs
1989 songs
1990 singles
Songs written by Van Morrison
Song recordings produced by Van Morrison